Weiten is a town in the district of Melk in the Austrian state of Lower Austria.

Population

References

Cities and towns in Melk District